Hemoglobinuria is a condition in which the oxygen transport protein hemoglobin is found in abnormally high concentrations in the urine. The condition is caused by excessive intravascular hemolysis, in which large numbers of red blood cells (RBCs) are destroyed, thereby releasing free hemoglobin into the plasma. Excess hemoglobin is filtered by the kidneys, which excrete it into the urine, giving urine a purple color. Hemoglobinuria can lead to acute tubular necrosis which is an uncommon cause of a death of uni-traumatic patients recovering in the ICU.

Causes 
 Acute glomerulonephritis
 Burns
 Renal cancer
 Malaria
 Paroxysmal nocturnal hemoglobinuria
 Microangiopathies, e.g. hemolytic-uremic syndrome (HUS), thrombotic thrombocytopenic purpura (TTP) leading to microangiopathic hemolytic anemia
 Transfusion reactions
 IgM autoimmune hemolytic anemia
 Glucose-6-phosphate dehydrogenase deficiency
 Pyelonephritis
 Sickle cell anemia
 Tuberculosis of the urinary tract
 March hemoglobinuria secondary to repetitive impacts on the body, usually the feet
 Athletic nephritis secondary to strenuous exercise
 Acute lead poisoning

Diagnosis 
The diagnosis is often made based on the medical history, blood samples, and a urine sample. The absence of urine RBCs and RBC casts microscopically despite a positive dipstick test suggests hemoglobinuria or myoglobinuria. The medical term for RBCs in the urine is hematuria.

See also
 Hematuria

References

External links 

Abnormal clinical and laboratory findings for urine